Whiteway is an English surname. Notable people with the surname include:

Dean Whiteway (born 1944), Canadian politician
Douglas Whiteway (21st century), Canadian journalist and author
William Whiteway (1828–1908), Premier of Newfoundland
William Tuff Whiteway (1856–1940), Canadian architect

English-language surnames